Volpi is a surname of Italian origin, meaning foxes or of the fox. The name refers to:
Alberto Volpi (b. 1962), Italian road bicycle racer
Alessandro Volpi (b. 1963), Italian politician and historian
Alfredo Volpi (1896–1988), Italian-Brazilian modernist painter
Alice Volpi (b. 1992), Italian right-handed foil fencer
Bruno Volpi (b. 1993), Argentine professional footballer
Charles P. de Volpi (1911–1981), Canadian philatelist
Christian Volpi (b. 1965), French water polo player
Franco Volpi (actor) (1921–1997), Italian actor and voice actor
Franco Volpi (philosopher) (1952-2009), Italian philosopher, historian of philosophy and professor
Gabriele Volpi, Italian-born Nigerian businessman
Giacomo Lauri-Volpi (1892–1979), Italian operatic tenor
Giovanni Volpi (b. 1937), Italian automobile racing manager
Giovanni Antonio Volpi (1686 – 1766), Italian editor and poet
Giovanni Pietro Volpi (1585–1636), Roman Catholic prelate
Giulia Volpi (b. 1970), Italian gymnast
Giuseppe Volpi (1877–1947), Italian politician 
Giuseppe Volpi (sailor) (1908–), Italian sailor
Grazia Volpi (1941–2020), Italian film producer
Guido Volpi (b. 1995), Argentine rugby union footballer
Jorge Volpi (b. 1968), Mexican novelist and essayist
Marisa Volpi (1928–2015), Italian art historian and writer
Mike Volpi (b. 1966), Italian-American venture capitalist
Roberto Volpi (b. 1952), Italian predominantly steeplechase runner
Sergio Volpi (b. 1974), Italian professional football player
Tiago Volpi (b. 1990), Brazilian professional football player
Ulpiano Volpi or Volpiano Volpi (1559–1629), Italian Roman Catholic prelate

Italian-language surnames